Bridouxia ponsonbyi is a species of tropical freshwater snail with a gill and an operculum, an aquatic gastropod mollusc in the family Paludomidae.

This species is found in Burundi, Tanzania, and Zambia. Its natural habitat is freshwater lakes. It is threatened by habitat loss.

References

Paludomidae
Gastropods described in 1889
Taxonomy articles created by Polbot